The Temple of Baalat Gebal ( maebad baalat jbeil) was an important Bronze Age temple structure in the World Heritage Site of Byblos. The temple was dedicated to Ba'alat Gebal, the goddess of the city of Byblos, known later to the Greeks as Atargatis. Built in 2800 BCE, it was the largest and most important sanctuary in ancient Byblos, and is considered to be "one of the first monumental structures of the Syro-Palestinian region". Two centuries after the construction of the Temple of Baalat Gebal, the Temple of the Obelisks was built approximately 100m to the east.

The length and continuity of its history as an active temple is "remarkable" and "supports its centrality in the life of the city".

An important group of Byblos figurines were found in the temple; these figurines have become the "poster child" of the Lebanese Tourism Ministry.

Background 
The temple, and its patroness, Ba‘alat Gebal, were venerated in the city for more than two millennia during the Canaanite and Phoenician eras. It was constructed when Byblos had close ties with Egypt, and a number of Egyptian references are found throughout the temple complex. The temple itself was expanded a number of times and remained in use until the Roman era.

Modern identification and excavation

The site of the temple is near the Crusaders' Byblos Castle, and was first excavated by French archaeologist Pierre Montet from 1921–24 and subsequently in the early part of Maurice Dunand's excavation of the city. Montet published two sketches of his excavations, and Dunand published a few plans for the wider sector of excavations in his 1939 volume. Almost all of the artifacts found in the excavation of the temple are displayed at the National Museum of Beirut. 

The temple now sits east of the Roman theater. The theater,  built around AD 218, was reconstructed and moved to allow excavation of the temple site.

Gallery

Notes

References
 
 
 Espinel, Andrés Diego. “The Role of the Temple of Ba'alat Gebal as Intermediary between Egypt and Byblos during the Old Kingdom.” Studien Zur Altägyptischen Kultur, vol. 30, 2002, pp. 103–119. JSTOR, www.jstor.org/stable/25152861.

Archaeological reports

External links

Byblos
Temples in Lebanon
Phoenician sites in Lebanon
Phoenician temples
History of Byblos